2MASS J0523−1403 is a very-low-mass red dwarf or high-mass brown dwarf about 40 light-years from Earth in the southern constellation of Lepus. With a very faint visual magnitude of 21.05 and a low effective temperature of 2074 K. It is visible primarily in large telescopes sensitive to infrared light. 2MASS J0523−1403 was first observed as part of the Two Micron All-Sky Survey (2MASS).

Characteristics

It has a stellar classification of L2.5 and a V−K color index of 9.42. The mass is calculated to be . Observation with the Hubble Space Telescope has detected no companion beyond 0.15 arcsecond. Sporadic radio emissions were detected by the VLA in 2004. H-alpha (Hα) emissions have also been detected, a sign of chromospheric activity.

Hydrogen burning limit

Members of the RECONS group have recently identified 2MASS J0523−1403 as representative of the smallest possible stars. Its small radius is at the local minimums of the radius–luminosity and radius–temperature trends. This local minimum is predicted to occur at the hydrogen burning limit due to differences in the radius-mass relationships of stars and brown dwarfs. Unlike hydrogen-burning stars, brown dwarfs decrease in radius as mass increases due to their cores being supported by degeneracy pressure. As the mass increases an increasing fraction of the brown dwarf is degenerate causing the radius to shrink as mass increases. The minimum stellar mass is estimated to be between 0.07 and 0.077 , comparable to the mass of 2MASS J0523−1403.

See also
 OGLE-TR-122
 OGLE-TR-123
 EBLM J0555-57
 SSSPM J0829-1309 - Another star with very similar properties.

References

Lepus (constellation)
L-type stars
J05233822-1403022
TIC objects